Marienkhof (German) (Dunayevka (Russian), Kottslyauken (US)) is an former air base in Kaliningrad Oblast, Russia located 10 km south of Pionersky.  It was in use during the 1950s and has been abandoned near the end of the Cold War.  It has a spartan layout, unimproved pads, if any, and an alert strip feeding directly onto the runway threshold.

In the mid-1950s up to 75 Ilyushin Il-28 (ASCC: Beagle) tactical bombers were based at Marienkhof.  There was a significant drawdown in forces by 1962, by which aircraft were rarely observed at the airfield except for the occasional Il-28, indicating Marienkhof became a reserve airfield.

It is now the location of Pionersky Radar Station.

References

Soviet Air Force bases
Soviet Air Defence Force bases
Airports in Kaliningrad Oblast